TW or tw may refer to:

Arts and entertainment
 Tomorrow's World, a British TV series
 Total War (series), a computer strategy game series
 Trade Wars, a 1984 online space trading game
 Tribal Wars, an online strategy game
 The Wanted, a British boy band
James TW, English singer-songwriter
The Wiggles, an Australian children's band

Companies
 Time Warner, a media company
 Taylor Wimpey, a housebuilding company
 Towers Watson, a consulting firm, NYSE and NASDAQ symbols TW
 T'way Air, IATA code TW since 2010
 Trans World Airlines, IATA code TW until 2001

Places
 Tunbridge Wells, a town in Kent, UK
 Twickenham postcode area, UK, in Greater London and Surrey, England
 Taiwan (ISO code TW)
 Tsuen Wan, in Hong Kong
 Tumwater

Other uses
 .tw, a top-level Internet domain (Taiwan)
 Shorthand of Technical Writer or Technical Writing 
 Terawatt, a unit of power
 Tiger Woods (born 1975), American golfer
 Transgender woman
 Trigger warning, alerting readers/viewers to a stress-related trauma trigger within content
 Tupamaros West-Berlin, a Marxist organization
 TouchWiz, a phone touch interface
 Treatment week, a pharmacological phrase
 Twi language (ISO 639-1 language code)
 Wikipedia:Twinkle, a JavaScript Wikipedia gadget that assists autoconfirmed registered users to deal with acts of vandalism or unconstructive edits.